Jarno "Jarppi" Leppälä (born 11 August 1979) is a Finnish television personality and a member of the stunt group the Dudesons.

Biography
Leppälä was born in Seinäjoki, South Ostrobothnia.

Around 2001, Leppälä (along with childhood friends Jarno Laasala, Jukka Hildén and HP Parviainen) began filming The Dudesons, originally seen on MoonTV. Shortly after, the Dudesons began touring and doing live performances. They have made several television shows and one feature film and also collaborated with Jackass.

During his career Leppälä has also hosted television shows among other things.

Personal life
Leppälä has two sons (born 2010 and 2014) with his wife, singer Elina Karttunen.

Filmography

TV
 Maailmankiertue (Finnish, 2001–2003)
Törkytorstai (Finnish, 2003–2004)
Duudsoni Elämää (Finnish, 2004)
Viva La Bam (season 5, 2005)
The Dudesons (2006–2016)
Piilokamerapäälliköt (Finnish, 2008)
Operaatio Maa (Finnish, 2008)
Los Premios MTV Latinoamérica 2008 (Introduced Paramore, 2008)
Teräspallit (Finnish, 2010)
The Dudesons in America (2010)
2010 MTV Europe Music Awards (2010)
Tanssii tähtien kanssa (Finnish 2011) (finalist)
Duudsonit tuli taloon (Finnish, 2012–2018)
Loiter Squad (2013)
Ridiculousness (2014)
Posse (Finnish, 2014–present)
Kirppiksen kingi (Finnish, 2020–present)
Kioski (Finnish, 2021)

Film
The Dudesons Movie (2006)
Bam Margera Presents: Where the ♯$&% Is Santa? (2008)
Minghags (2009)
Jackass 3D (2010)
Jackass 3.5 (2011)
Jackass 4.5 (archive footage, uncredited, 2022)

References

External links

The Dudesons - Jarppi (archived)
Finnish site - Jarppi (archived)

Living people
1979 births
People from Seinäjoki
Finnish male actors
Finnish stunt performers